Vampire Killer is a 1986 Castlevania game for the MSX2.

Vampire Killer may also refer to: 

 Castlevania: Bloodlines, a 1994 video game for the Sega Genesis, known as Vampire Killer in Japan
 "Vampire Killer" (song), a recurring theme song in the Castlevania series
 Vampire Killer (whip), a fictional weapon in the Castlevania series
 Vampire Killer, a nickname for the American serial killer Richard Chase

See also
 Vampire hunter, a traditional/folk occupation in the Balkans
 The Fearless Vampire Killers, a 1967 film
 Buffy the Vampire Slayer (disambiguation)